Eckart Muthesius (17 May 1904 in Berlin – 9 August 1989) was a German architect and interior designer.

His most famous commission was the Manik Bagh palace for Maharaja Yashwant Rao Holkar II (1908–1961) for the use of himself and his wife Sanyogita.

References 

1904 births
1989 deaths
German interior designers
20th-century German architects